Gholamreza Emrani (also Romanized as "Gholāmrezā Emrāni", ; born 1947 in Zabol, Iran) is an Iranian linguist and an iconic figure in the field of Sistanian studies. He is best known for his extensive contributions to the Iranian Curriculum Development Center as well as publishing a lot of exquisite works generally under the title of the Majmue-ye-Sistan (Sistan Series) with regards to Sistanian dialect documentation.

Apart from his academic career and contributions to the Iranian Ministry of Education, he has also published many books falling into several categories, including Persian history, grammar and literature, and numerous articles in linguistics in national language journals.

Works/Publications

Books

Articles

Awards and Recognition

The Sistan Series, his multi-volume set of analytical and descriptive documentation of Sistanian dialect, which is regarded as the best work of its kind in Iran, was appreciated in the Iranian Season's Book Awards ceremony in 2010.

References

Linguists from Iran
Living people
Iranian grammarians
Grammarians of Persian
Linguists of Persian
Iranian writers
People from Sistan and Baluchistan Province
1947 births
Sistani culture
20th-century linguists
21st-century linguists